The 1987 World Table Tennis Championships – Swaythling Cup (men's team) was the 39th edition of the men's team championship.

China won the gold medal defeating Sweden 5–0 in the final. Jan-Ove Waldner and Mikael Appelgren were both missing from the final due to stomach complaints. North Korea won the bronze medal.

Medalists

Swaythling Cup tables

Group A

Group B

Group C

Group D

Quarter finals

Semifinals

Third-place playoff

Final

See also
List of World Table Tennis Championships medalists

References

-